Kanstantsin Lepin (born 17 June 1988) is a Belarusian former professional footballer.

External links

1988 births
Living people
Belarusian footballers
Association football defenders
FC Dnepr Mogilev players
FC Rechitsa-2014 players
FC Khimik Svetlogorsk players
People from Babruysk
Sportspeople from Mogilev Region